Neycho Hristov Neev (born 9 February 1948) is a Bulgarian politician who served as vice-Prime Minister and Minister of Transport in the Berov government from December 1992 to June 1993.

Between 1980 and 1989, he was employed as the main energy specialist in Kremikovtzi. In the early 1990s, Neev was a member of the UDF before turning to business in 1995.

References 

1948 births
Living people
People from Haskovo Province
Union of Democratic Forces (Bulgaria) politicians
Government ministers of Bulgaria